Wookey railway station was a station on the Bristol and Exeter Railway's Cheddar Valley line in Somerset, England. The site is a 0.04 hectare geological Site of Special Scientific Interest between Wells and Wookey Hole

History
The station opened on 1 August 1871 about a year after the extension of the broad gauge line from Cheddar to Wells had been built. The line was converted to standard gauge in the mid-1870s and then linked up to the East Somerset Railway to provide through services from Yatton to Witham in 1878. All the railways involved were absorbed into the Great Western Railway in the 1870s.

The station was host to a GWR camp coach from 1935 to 1939.

The Yatton to Witham line closed to passengers in 1963; Wookey station closed on 9 September 1963, though goods traffic continued to the paper mills at Wookey until 1965. Wookey station had a small wooden building, unlike some of the other stations on the line which had impressive stone buildings. The site was cleared after closure.

Site of Special Scientific Interest

A small, silty channel-infilling has yielded an assemblage of palynomorph spores dating from the  last (Devensian) glacial period.

See also
 Bruton Railway Cutting

References

 

Wookey
Former Great Western Railway stations
Railway stations in Great Britain opened in 1871
Railway stations in Great Britain closed in 1963
Sites of Special Scientific Interest in Somerset
Sites of Special Scientific Interest notified in 1997
Geology of Somerset
Railway cuttings in the United Kingdom